Muhammad Azroy Hazalwafie Izhar Ahmad (born 4 April 1994), is a Malaysian weightlifter who won the gold medal in the men's 56 kg weight class at the 2018 Commonwealth Games in Gold Coast, Australia.

He broke previous snatch record of 116kg in New Delhi in 2010 and total of 260kg in Manchester Games in 2002 set by Amirul Hamizan Ibrahim holding the Games record in snatch with 117kg before finishing with a total of 261kg in 2018 Gold Coast Commonwealth Games.

References

External links

1994 births
Living people
Malaysian people of Malay descent
Malaysian male weightlifters
Commonwealth Games gold medallists for Malaysia
Commonwealth Games medallists in weightlifting
Weightlifters at the 2018 Commonwealth Games
People from Pahang
20th-century Malaysian people
21st-century Malaysian people
Medallists at the 2018 Commonwealth Games